V-A or V−A may refer to:

 "Vector minus axial", a theory of weak interaction
 Vetenskap & Allmänhet